Abell 33 is a planetary nebula located 2700 light years away in the constellation of Hydra. It lies just behind the star HD 83535. The star HD 83535 is also responsible for the "diamond ring" effect seen in the photograph.

References

http://www.caelumobservatory.com/gallery/abell33.shtml 
http://www.skyhound.com/observing/archives/mar/A_33.html

External links
 

Abell 33
33
Hydra (constellation)